Semir Mete (born 27 October 1987) is a Swedish footballer who plays as a midfielder. He played in the Allsvenskan for Syrianska FC.

References

External links

1987 births
Living people
Association football midfielders
Syrianska FC players
Allsvenskan players
Superettan players
Swedish footballers
Husqvarna FF players
Syrianska IF Kerburan players
Eskilstuna City FK players